Barry Warren (born 12 July 1933 in London, died 22 February 1994 in Chichester, Sussex) was a British actor, born as Barry Christopher J. Warren. He trained at RADA, graduating in 1955. As well as several stage and TV appearances, including one episode of the sci-fi drama Undermind (1965) for ABC Weekend Television, he played three major characters for Hammer Film Productions: Carl Ravna in The Kiss of the Vampire (1963); Don Manuel Rodríguez de Sevilla in The Devil-Ship Pirates (1963); and Karl in Frankenstein Created Woman (1967).

Actress Sarah Miles wrote in her autobiography that before dying in 1994 the actor had a sex change operation and lived for five years as Claire Warren.

Filmography

Television

References

External links
 
 

1933 births
1994 deaths
English male film actors
English male television actors
English male stage actors
20th-century English male actors
Alumni of RADA